Hulen Mall is a diverse-scale shopping mall located in southwest Fort Worth, Texas, United States. Located at the southwest corner of Interstate 20 and Hulen Street, it is in the southwest side of the DFW Metroplex.

The mall is anchored by two major department stores and contains 118 specialty shops and stores.

History 
Hulen Mall was officially dedicated on the 4th of August 1977, designed by HOK and developed by The Rouse Company.

Upon the mall's opening, a pre-existing Sanger-Harris would be joined by a Montgomery Ward department store as anchors.

The mall would encompass 580,000 leasable square feet, and 87 stores at opening.

The mall would exist in its original state until July 1993, when it would undergo a western expansion.  Included in the new wing would be a replacement food court and a Dillard's Department Store. The expansion would be dedicated on August 24, 1994. After the expansion the mall's total retail floor area would grow to a total of 916,700 sq ft.

In 2004, The Rouse Company would be sold to General Growth Properties, with ownership of the property being transferred within the year.

The mall would undergo light cosmetic renovations starting in 2011, with 25,330 square feet of restaurants being added to the eastern facade. Among these new tenants would be Red Robin, Abuelo's Mexican Food Embassy & BJ's Brewhouse, openings  being held between 2011 and 2013. Upon its completion the property would encompass 942,000 square feet.

Amenities (1977) 
The mall would have many unique features, such as an early food court known as "The Park". Some tenants opening with "The Park" would include, Chelsea Street Pub, Chick-Fil-A, Claim Jumper Hamburgers, Cookie Cupboard, Heidi's Bavarian Deli, Love That Yogurt, Ol' Dan Tucker's Smokehouse, Pietro's Pizza, and Swensen's Ice Cream Parlor.

Anchor History 
On May 5, 1977, a 200,000 square foot, 3 Story Sanger-Harris would open to the public. It included in store features such as, a Beauty Salon, a Potting Shed restaurant and a Design Studio. It would predate the mall by months.

On August 4, 1977, a 154,000 square foot, 2-Story Montgomery Ward would be dedicated along with the mall proper. Some features exclusive to the Montgomery Ward store would include, a Beauty Salon, a Frontier Room restaurant, Pharmacy and freestanding Auto Center.

In July 1987, the mall's existing Sanger-Harris department store would be rebranded Foley's. The chain's parent company, Federated Department Stores had decided to merge the two chains in an attempt to consolidate operations.

On August 24, 1994, a 336,700 square foot, 3 Story Dillard's would join the mall as its third anchor store, it would be dedicated with the mall's western wing.

In March 2001, the mall's Montgomery Ward department store would undergo its liquidation and would close with the rest of its chain.

On March 21, 2002, the former  Montgomery Ward space would be assumed by a Sears. 

On September 9, 2006, Foley's would be re-branded as Macy's, as part of Federated Department Stores acquisition and re-branding of May Department Stores.

On July 11, 2020, it was announced that Sears would be closing as part of a plan to close 28 stores nationwide. The store would complete its liquidation in late August.

2018 Molotov Attacks 
On May 11, 2018, a man lit Molotov cocktails inside the Dillard's and Sears department stores in the mall. Although there were no reported injuries or damages, the man ran off and his identity is yet to be discovered and there is no known motive. However, on May 18, the same suspect set off another Molotov cocktail, this time inside Sears again and thanks to the employees efforts to track down the suspect, the Fort Worth Police Department was able to detain the 46-year-old male.

Anchor Stores

Traditional Anchors 
 Dillard's (336,700 square feet, 3 stories) — opened on August 24, 1994 
 Macy's (200,000 square feet, 3 stories) — opened in May 1977 as Sanger-Harris, became Foley's in July 1987, became Macy's on September 9, 2006

Junior Anchors 

 Macy's Backstage
 H&M

Former Anchors 

 Sears (154,000 square feet, 2 stories) — opened on August 4, 1977 as Montgomery Ward, closed March 2001, became Sears on March 21, 2002, closed August 2020

Notes

External links
Official website

Brookfield Properties
Shopping malls in the Dallas–Fort Worth metroplex
Buildings and structures in Fort Worth, Texas
Shopping malls established in 1977
Economy of Fort Worth, Texas
Tourist attractions in Fort Worth, Texas